The 2014 Enterprise Cup was the 76th time that the Enterprise Cup has been contested.

Fixtures and results

2014
2014 in African rugby union
2014 rugby union tournaments for clubs
2014 in Kenyan sport